Aminomethylbenzoic acid (more precisely, 4-aminomethylbenzoic acid or p-aminomethylbenzoic acid, PAMBA) is an antifibrinolytic.

See also
 4-Aminobenzoic acid

References 

Antifibrinolytics